Songs is the second studio album by the British dubstep musician Rusko. It was released on March 26, 2012 through Mad Decent and contains the singles "Somebody to Love" and "Thunder".

Track listing

Charts

References

2012 albums
Rusko (musician) albums